Jegi-dong is a dong, neighbourhood of Dongdaemun-gu in Seoul, South Korea.

See also 
Administrative divisions of South Korea

Jegi-dong is an area of Dongdaemun-gu. It is known for its traditional markets, Gyeongdong Market and Dongseo Market. You can find a wide variety of dried herbs and substances used for Korean traditional medicine. 

Near exit 2 of Jegi-dong station, there are a variety of buffet style restaurants. Patrons are able to purchase a filling meal for prices that range from 6900 won for pork to 9500 won for beef. Some restaurants also include a serving of bulgogi in the allotted price.

References

External links
Dongdaemun-gu map

Neighbourhoods of Dongdaemun District